Fisher West Farm is a historic home and farm located in Perry Township, Allen County, Indiana.  The farmhouse was built about 1860, and is a two-story, Italianate style brick dwelling.  It consists of a two-story, main block topped by a low hipped roof and belvedere; a two-story hip roofed wing; and one story gabled kitchen wing.  It features a full-width front porch.  Also on the property are the contributing gabled rectangular bank barn and shed-roofed pump house.

It was listed on the National Register of Historic Places in 1985.

References

Farms on the National Register of Historic Places in Indiana
Italianate architecture in Indiana
Houses completed in 1860
Buildings and structures in Allen County, Indiana
National Register of Historic Places in Allen County, Indiana